Società Sportiva Dilettantisticha a responsabilità limitata Cjarlins Muzane, or simply Cjarlins Muzane, is an Italian association football club located in Carlino, Friuli-Venezia Giulia. It currently plays in Serie D.

The club was born in 2003 as US Cjarlins Muzane from the merger between AC Futura (from Carlino, red-blue colors) and SS Muzzanese (from Muzzana del Turgnano, orange color)

History
The origin of Cjarlins Muzane date back to 2003, when the new club took life (and registration number 58127) from Muzzanese, which was the only team to play football in the zone after the interruption of AC Futura activity. Leading the transition is Fernando Targato, patron of SS Muzzanese who becomes the secretary (and still is today) of the club, whose command was immediately taken over by the entrepreneur Vincenzo Zanutta the owner of Zanutta S.p.a., who has always been at the helm of the orange-heavenly team ever since.A curiosity concerns the choice of the name: initially, the newborn association could not decide, therefore, also on the inspiration of ASD Lavarian Mortean (born from the merger of Lavariano and Mortegliano), a name was adopted that would highlight the villages of Carlino and Muzzana, expressing them in Friulian.From its foundation to today, it has been a continuous advancement of the category, given that the Cjarlins Muzane in its history has never known relegation. The first appearance is in the 2003-04 Terza Categoria Championship. The following year the club wins the tournament and flies to the Seconda Categoria. The freshman season is interlocutory, but the following year leads to the primacy and the jump to the Prima Categoria. The rule of the second year is always valid and so, after a quiet salvation, the landing in Promozione arrives through the play-offs. In this category, Cjarlins Muzane participated for three years, then win the championship - after a second place the previous year behind ASD Lignano - and fly to Eccellenza. In 2017 the promotion to Serie D arrives and the club completes the ride in the amateur leagues.

Seasons

Key

Honours
Eccellenza Friuli-Venezia Giulia (1st regional level)
Winners: 2016–17

Promozione Friuli-Venezia Giulia (2nd regional level)
Winners: 2011–12

Seconda Categoria Friuli-Venezia Giulia (4th regional level)
Winners: 2006–07

Terza Categoria Friuli-Venezia Giulia (lowest regional level)
Winners: 2004–05

Coppa Italia Dilettanti Friuli-Venezia Giulia
Runners-up: 2016–17

Colors and badge 
The team's colors are orange and light blue.

References

External links
Official website 
Cjarlins Muzane page @ friuligol.it
Cjarlins Muzane page @ tuttocampo.it
Cjarlins Muzane page @ facebook.com

Football clubs in Italy
Football clubs in Friuli-Venezia Giulia
2003 establishments in Italy